The Institute of Tropical Forest Conservation (ITFC) is a post-graduate research institute based in the Bwindi Impenetrable Forest, in south-western Uganda. The institute is a semi-autonomous part of Mbarara University of Science and Technology and is focused on research, training, and monitoring for conservation management in the Albertine Rift ecoregion.

ITFC is located on the Eastern border of Bwindi Impenetrable National Park in Ruhija village, Rubanda district of South Western Uganda. The long history of ITFC's work in ecological and sociological research has established it as a leading post graduate research institution and field station. With over 200 publications about conservation in the region and a wealth of national, regional and international partners and donors - ITFC's work in conservation has influenced the direction of conservation the world over, and more specifically in the Albertine Rift ecoregion.

The Bwindi Impenetrable Forest is a tropical moist broadleaf forest in the Afromontane Albertine Rift montane forests ecoregion. It is primarily protected within the Bwindi Impenetrable National Park (BINP).

History

The IFPC became the ITFC - a semi autonomous academic unit of Mbarara University of Science and Technology in 1991, the same year in which Bwindi Impenetrable National Park was established. The Establishment of Bwindi Impenetrable and Mgahinga National Parks was after a successful recommendation by ITFC (then IFCP), Mbarara University of Science and Technology and other conservation partners after they expressed the danger that Bwindi and Mgahinga Forests faced if not quickly gazetted as National parks.

Work 
As part of their work, ITFC carries out ecological research and monitoring on the state on both plants and animals all around the Albertine Rift ecoregion. This puts makes places such as Mount Rwenzori National Park, Queen Elizabeth National Park, Semuliki National Park, Mount Elgon National Park, Mgahinga National National Park, Bwindi Impenetrable National Park and the Greater Virunga Landscape. Activities such as vegetation monitoring, animal monitoring, Gorilla population census, community involvement in conservation, promotion of sustainable tourism practice among so many others are the regular activities at ITFC.

www.itfc.must.ac.ug www.must.ac.ug

References

External links

Forestry in Uganda
Forest conservation organizations
Forest research institutes
Nature conservation in Uganda
Forests of Uganda
Kanungu District
Kisoro District
Non-profit organisations based in Uganda
Research institutes in Uganda
Environmental organizations established in 1986
Scientific organizations established in 1986
1986 establishments in Uganda
Afromontane forests